Cambridge Seven Associates, Inc. (stylized as CambridgeSeven, and sometimes as C7A) is an American architecture firm based in Cambridge, Massachusetts. Buildings designed by the firm have included academic, museum, exhibit, hospitality, transportation, retail, office, and aquarium facilities, and have been built in North America, Europe, the Middle East, and Asia. Besides architecture, it operates in the areas of urban design, planning, exhibitions, graphic, and interior design.

The company was founded in 1962. The original seven partners were Lou Bakanowsky, Ivan Chermayeff, Peter Chermayeff, Alden Christie, Paul Dietrich, Tom Geismar, and Terry Rankine.

CambridgeSeven won the American Institute of Architects Architecture Firm Award in 1993, and was described by the AIA Committee on Design as "an influential and stimulating example, demonstrating new directions of professional practice."

In 2016, the company's revenue was $26 million.

Notable projects

Academic
 College of Business, Kuwait University, Sabah Al-Salem University City, Kuwait
 College of Engineering and Petroleum, Kuwait University, Sabah Al-Salem University City, Kuwait
 College for Life Sciences, Kuwait University, Sabah Al-Salem University City, Kuwait
 Edwards Center for Art and Dance, Bowdoin College, Brunswick, Maine
 Health and Social Sciences Building, University of Massachusetts Lowell, Lowell, Massachusetts
 Kanbar Hall, Bowdoin College, Brunswick, Maine
 Learning Laboratory for Complex Systems, MIT, Cambridge, Massachusetts
 Marine Technology & Life Sciences Seawater Research Complex, Rosenstiel School of Marine and Atmospheric Science, University of Miami, Miami, Florida
 Marine Science Center at Fintas, Kuwait University, Fintas, Kuwait
 Nettie M. Stevens Science and Innovation Center, Westfield State University, Westfield, Massachusetts
 Peter Buck Center for Health and Fitness, Bowdoin College, Brunswick, Maine
 Pulichino Tong Business Center, University of Massachusetts Lowell, Lowell, Massachusetts
 Roux Center for the Environment, Bowdoin College, Brunswick, Maine
 Williams College Bookstore, Williams College, Williamstown, Massachusetts

Aquariums
 MOTE Aquarium, Sarasota, Florida
 National Aquarium, Baltimore, Maryland
 National Aquarium of Saudi Arabia, King Abdullah Financial District, Riyadh, Saudi Arabia
 New England Giant Ocean Tank, New England Aquarium, Boston, Massachusetts 
 New England Aquarium, Boston, Massachusetts, United States, the firm's first major commission
 North Carolina Aquarium at Roanoke Island, Manteo, North Carolina
 Oceanário de Lisbon, Lisbon, Portugal
 Ring of Fire Aquarium, Osaka, Japan
 Roundhouse Aquarium, Manhattan Beach, California
 Tennessee Aquarium, Chattanooga, Tennessee
 The Scientific Center of Kuwait, Salmiya, Kuwait
 Virginia Aquarium & Marine Science Center, Virginia Beach, Virginia
 World Alive Exhibits, Discovery Place Science, Charlotte, North Carolina

Civic
 Elevated Walkways, Logan International Airport, Boston, Massachusetts 
 Gloucester Harborwalk, Gloucester, Massachusetts 
 Howard Ulfelder, Maryland, Healing Garden, Yawkey Center for Outpatient Care, Massachusetts General Hospital, Boston, Massachusetts
 Kuwait Ministry of Education Headquarters Building, South Surra District, Kuwait
 Kuwait National Petroleum Company Headquarters, Ahmadi, Kuwait
 MBTA Design Guidelines, Boston, Massachusetts

 WBUR CitySpace, Boston University, Boston, Massachusetts 
 West Cambridge Youth Center, Cambridge, Massachusetts
 Yawkey Center for Outpatient Care, Massachusetts General Hospital, Boston, Massachusetts

Hospitality
 Ames Hotel, Boston, Massachusetts 
 Brookline Hilton Garden Inn, Brookline, Massachusetts
 Charles Hotel, Cambridge, Massachusetts
 Four Seasons Hotel & Private Residences One Dalton Street (with collaborating architects Pei Cobb Freed & Partners), Boston, Massachusetts
 Four Seasons Hotel & Private Residences New Orleans, New Orleans, Louisiana
 Hanover Inn at Dartmouth College, Hanover, New Hampshire
 Hilton Boston Logan Airport, Boston, Massachusetts
 PINE Restaurant at the Hanover Inn, Hanover, New Hampshire
 Revere Hotel Renovations, Boston, Massachusetts 
 The Liberty Hotel, Boston, Massachusetts 
 Williams Inn, Williams College, Williamstown, Massachusetts

Museums
 Boston Children's Museum, Boston, Massachusetts 
 Canada Sports Hall of Fame, Calgary, Alberta, Canada
 Detroit Red Wings & Pistons Heritage Exhibit, Detroit, Michigan
 Discovery Museum of Acton, Acton, Massachusetts
 Children's Discovery Museum, Hohhot, Inner Mongolia, China
 KAFD Science Museum & Geo-Climate Center, Riyadh, Saudi Arabia 
 Knock Knock Children's Museum, Baton Rouge, Louisiana
 Murphy Keller Education Center, Heifer International Headquarters, Little Rock, Arkansas
 Naismith Memorial Basketball Hall of Fame, Springfield, Massachusetts
 San Francisco 49ers Museum & Exhibits, Levi's Stadium, Santa Clara, California
 The Hall at Patriot Place, Gillette Stadium, Foxborough, Massachusetts 
 World of Little League Museum Renovation and Exhibits, Williamsport, Pennsylvania

Notes

References
'Cambridge Seven Names Johnson President,' High Profile.com Article on New President of Cambridge Seven, January 2017
'The People's Architect,' Boston Globe article on Peter Kuttner, President of CambridgeSeven

External links

Design companies established in 1962
Companies based in Cambridge, Massachusetts
Architecture firms based in Massachusetts
1962 establishments in Massachusetts